Live at the Britt Festival is a live album by Michael Nesmith, released in 1999. It was recorded live at the Britt Festival in Jacksonville, Oregon, on June 19, 1992. To prepare for the concert, Nesmith conducted a limited U.S. tour which featured a similar set list as the Britt Festival.

The performance was Nesmith's last with longtime collaborator and pedal steel guitarist Red Rhodes, who died on August 20, 1995.

The album features a rare occasion of Nesmith (as a solo artist) singing a Monkees song, "Papa Gene's Blues" (originally from the album The Monkees).

Track listing
All songs written by Michael Nesmith except as otherwise noted.
 "Two Different Roads" – 3:49
 "Papa Gene's Blues" – 4:50
 "Propinquity (I've Just Begun to Care)" – 5:53
 "Some of Shelly's Blues" – 3:17
 "Joanne" – 6:52
 "Tomorrow and Me" – 4:24
 "The Upside of Goodbye" – 3:32
 "Harmony Constant" – 4:22
 "Silver Moon" – 5:05
 "5 Second Concerts" (Hobbs, Nesmith) – 1:53
 "Yellow Butterfly" – 5:52
 "Moon over the Rio Grande" – 5:43
 "Juliana" – 6:07
 "Laugh Kills Lonesome" – 4:00
 "I Am Not That" – 2:31
 "Rising in Love" – 4:34
 "Rio" – 5:50
 "Different Drum" – 2:40
 "I Am Not That (Reprise)" – 2:43

Personnel
Michael Nesmith – vocals, guitar, liner notes
Red Rhodes – pedal steel guitar
Joe Chemay – bass
Luis Conte – percussion
John Hobbs – keyboards
John Jorgenson – guitar
Production notes
Mike McDonald – mixing
Lee Collett – audio supervisor

References

Michael Nesmith albums
1999 live albums
Cooking Vinyl live albums